Jeremiah Hacker (1801 – August 27, 1895) was a missionary, reformer, vegetarian, and journalist who wrote and published The Pleasure Boat and The Chariot of Wisdom and Love in Portland, Maine from 1845 to 1866.

Biography
Born in Brunswick, Maine to a large Quaker family, Hacker moved to Portland as a young adult. He lost his hearing, and used an ear trumpet. He married Submit Tobey, known as Mittie, in 1846. He was a Portland newspaper publisher for two decades. He was strikingly tall with a big, bushy beard. After the Great Fire of 1866, Hacker left Portland and retired to a life of farming in Vineland, New Jersey, where he continued to write, sending letters and poems in to Anarchist and Free thought newspapers until his death in 1895.

Career
In Portland, he worked as a penmanship instructor, a teacher, and a shopkeeper. Eventually he sold his shop in 1841 and took to the road as an itinerant preacher during the Second Great Awakening. He traveled through Maine, telling people to leave their churches and seek their inner light, or "that of God within."

Returning to Portland in 1845, Hacker began writing and printing a reform journal called The Pleasure Boat. According to Hacker himself, he sold his one good coat to pay for the newspaper's first edition. He wore a borrowed coat after that, which he referred to for years as "the old drab coat." He wrote his newspaper on his knee and lived in a boarding house in near-poverty, while he spent all his time getting his message out.

He became known as an outspoken journalist who railed against organized religion, government, prisons, slavery, land monopoly, and warfare. He was a proponent of abolition, women’s rights, temperance, and vegetarianism. He was an early proponent of anarchism, and free thought, he was also a prison reformer. Unhappy with how juvenile offenders were treated in the adult prisons, Hacker was influential in building public support for a Maine reform school which became the third in the country, after Philadelphia and Boston. Because of the culture of reform that existed in 19th-century New England, The Pleasure Boat enjoyed wide circulation until the approach of the American Civil War. On the brink of a war that many fellow reformers thought was unavoidable and morally justifiable, Hacker advocated pacifism, and lost so many readers his newspaper foundered. By 1864 he started another newspaper entitled The Chariot of Wisdom and Love.

Hacker has been described as "Maine’s original alt-journalist". He was known for criticizing quack doctors selling fake miracle cures.

Vegetarianism
Hacker was a vegetarian who championed animal rights, environmentalism and vegetarianism in his Pleasure Boat newspaper.   In the July 20, 1854 Pleasure Boat, Hacker commented: "It has been proved that those who live on vegetable food, bread, fruits, &c., are healthier, can perform more labor, endure more heat and cold, and live to a greater age, than flesh eaters."

Temperance
Hacker was a supporter of temperance but not of total alcohol prohibition. He did criticize the prohibition group the Martha Washingtons in 1845 when the group did organize a Christmas dinner at Exchange Hall in Portland that served "hogs and oxen."  Hacker wrote: “Animal food begets an unnatural thirst, which requires unnatural drink, and has been one of the greatest causes of drunkenness in this nation.”

Death
Hacker died on August 27, 1895 in Vineland, New Jersey at age 94. He is buried in the Siloam Cemetery.

Influence
Historian William Berry said: "In his time, Hacker, who was born in Brunswick was – if not famous –  strangely influential." Journalist Liz Graves of The Ellsworth American said: "his ideas about a society ordered by individual morals rather than government and laws closely mirror those of international anarchist Emma Goldman and others a few decades later." Journalist Avery Yale Kamila of the Portland Press Herald said: "All these years later, the Pleasure Boat reads like a roadmap to many issues that were to gain traction in the coming years." Authors Karen and Michael Iacobbo in their book Vegetarian America: A History have said that Hacker "helped cultivate" the vegetarian movement.

References

Further reading

1801 births
1895 deaths
19th-century American male writers
19th-century American newspaper publishers (people)
19th-century American non-fiction writers
American abolitionists
American animal rights activists
American anarchists
American male journalists
American male non-fiction writers
American opinion journalists
American pacifists
American Quakers
American vegetarianism activists
Anarchist writers
Freethought writers
Journalists from Maine
People from Vineland, New Jersey
People of Maine in the American Civil War
Writers from Brunswick, Maine
Writers from Portland, Maine
Activists from Portland, Maine